The California Governor's Office of Planning and Research, also known as OPR or Cal OPR, is the long-range planning and research agency of the government of California, and reports to the Governor of California. It was created by statute in 1970 and is part of the office of the Governor of California. Under Governor  Jerry Brown, its director was Ken Alex. In 2019, incoming governor Gavin Newsom appointed Kate Gordon to lead the office.

A major focus of the organization is helping the State of California mitigate and adapt to global warming. This includes promoting the use of public transit, and coordinating land use to maximize the benefits of public transit.

Its purview includes 
 Formulation of long-range land use goals and policies
 Conflict resolution among state agencies
 Coordination of federal grants for environmental goals
 Coordination of statewide environmental monitoring
 Coordination of research on growth and development
 Management of state planning grants, and encouragement of local and regional planning
 Creation and adoption of General Plan Guidelines
 Drafting of guidelines for compliance with the California Environmental Quality Act (CEQA)
 Creation of a State Environmental Goals and Policy Report, every four years
 Operation of the State Clearinghouse for distribution and review of CEQA documents
 Operation of the Integrated climate change adaptation and Resiliency Program
 Coordination of environmental justice activities
 Coordination with US military for land use and other issues in the state

References

Planning
Planning and Research